Breton mythology is the mythology or corpus of explanatory and heroic tales originating in Brittany. The Bretons are the descendants of insular Britons who settled in Brittany from at least the third century. While the Britons were already Christianised in this era, the migrant population maintained an ancient Celtic mythos, similar to those of Wales and Cornwall.

Breton mythology has many gods and mythical creatures specifically associated with nature cults. In this tradition of gods and creatures rooted in nature, there exist traces of certain Breton Catholic saints. 
 Ankou
 Bugul Noz
 Iannic-ann-ôd
 Korrigan
 Cannard Noz
 Morgens
 Morvan, legendary chief of the Viscounty of Léon
 Morvarc'h
 Ys

See also
 Cornish mythology
 Matter of Britain
 Mythology in France
 Welsh folklore
 Welsh mythology

References

External links
Timeless Myths: Armorican Connections
Legends and Romances of Brittany by Lewis Spence 1917

 
Celtic mythology